Protein-associating with the carboxyl-terminal domain of ezrin is a protein that in humans is encoded by the SCYL3 gene.

References

Further reading